Esthwaite Water is one of the smaller and lesser known lakes in the Lake District National Park in northern England. It is situated between the much larger lakes of Windermere and Coniston Water, in the traditional county of Lancashire; since 1974 in the county of Cumbria. To the north is the village of Hawkshead and to the west is Grizedale Forest.

It has been designated as a site of special scientific interest.

Etymology
Esthwaite may mean either "the eastern clearing", with Middle English est, probably replacing Old Norse austr 'east', and Norse þveit "clearing", or 'the clearing where ash trees grow', from Norse eski "ash trees, ash copse" (see askr) and again þveit. Derivation from Brittonic *ïstwïth, "bent, curved, flexible, supple" has also been suggested (Welsh ystwyth, see River Ystwyth).

'Water' is Old English wæter, "water" the dominant term for "lake" (c.f. Ullswater, Wastwater).

Wordsworth poems
The lake was mentioned as the location where William Wordsworth conversed with a friend in Wordsworth's poem, "Expostulation and Reply," part of Wordsworth's Lyrical Ballads and, in the same collection, it is the location for "Lines Left Upon A Seat In A Yew-Tree." Wordsworth also mentions it in his Prelude in line 267: "Make green peninsulas on Esthwaite's Lake", and also at line 570: "From Esthwaite's neighbouring lake the splitting ice".
The poem "The vale of Esthwaite" (1787) was Wordsworth's first effort at sustained composition.

Ecology
Esthwaite is notable as one of the most nutrient rich of the mesotrophic lakes in Cumbria, with large seasonal and inter-annual variations in phosphorus supply. As well as the more common British species of the genus Potamogeton, Najas flexilis is also present.

References

External links
 

Lakes of the Lake District
Sites of Special Scientific Interest in Cumbria
Ramsar sites in England
LEsthwaite
Beatrix Potter
Hawkshead